Pollenia paragrunini is a species of cluster fly in the family Polleniidae.

Distribution
Armenia, Azerbaijan.

References

Polleniidae
Insects described in 1988
Diptera of Europe